The Jamie Foxx Show is an American television sitcom that aired on The WB from August 28, 1996, to January 14, 2001. The series stars Jamie Foxx, Garcelle Beauvais, Christopher B. Duncan, Ellia English, and Garrett Morris. The show aired a total of 100 episodes over the course of its five seasons.

Series overview

Episodes

Season 1 (1996–1997)

Season 2 (1997–1998)

Season 3 (1998–1999)

Season 4 (1999–2000)

Season 5 (2000–2001)

External links
 
 

Jamie Foxx Show, The